Lesseps is a station in the Barcelona Metro network, named after its location, Plaça de Lesseps, in the Gràcia district of Barcelona, itself named after Ferdinand de Lesseps, who was appointed French consul in 1842. The station is served by line L3.

The station opened in 1924 as the northern terminus of the first metro line of the city, which ran south to Catalunya station and was operated by the Gran Metropolitano de Barcelona rail company. To the north of the station were terminal sidings, which in turn gave access to the Lesseps workshops via a vehicle elevator. The line was extended north to Montbau station in 1985, diverging to the right before the terminal sidings, which remain in existence although little used. The Lesseps workshops closed in 1988.

The station is located under Carrer Gran de Gràcia, between Carrer de Maurici Serrahima and Plaça de Lesseps, and can be accessed from the square, in the corner where Avinguda del Príncep d'Astúries ends.

Future plans are for Lesseps to be served by the joint section of lines L9 and L10. Platforms for this are currently under construction, and will provide interchange with line L3.

References

External links

Lesseps at Trenscat.com
Lesseps at Wiki del Transport Català, with photos and history of the station.

Barcelona Metro line 3 stations
Railway stations in Spain opened in 1924
Transport in Gràcia